Péter Bácsi (born 15 May 1983) is an amateur Hungarian Greco-Roman wrestler, who competes in the middleweight category. Two-time (2014 and 2018) world champion, he is also a three-time Olympian, and a four-time medalist in his division at the European Championships.

Bacsi made his international debut at the 2008 Summer Olympics, where he competed in the 74 kg class. He first defeated United States' T.C. Dantzler, Armenia's Arsen Julfalakyan, and Russia's Varteres Samourgachev in the preliminary rounds, before losing out to Georgia's Manuchar Kvirkvelia in the semi-finals, by a technical fall. Because his opponent advanced further into the final match, Bacsi automatically qualified for the bronze medal bout, where he was defeated by France's Christophe Guénot, with a classification score of 1–3.

At the 2012 Summer Olympics in London, Bacsi got injured in the second preliminary match of the 74 kg class, losing to Aleksandr Kazakevič.

Major results

References

External links

 
 NBC 2012 Olympics Profile

Hungarian male sport wrestlers
1983 births
Living people
Olympic wrestlers of Hungary
Wrestlers at the 2008 Summer Olympics
Wrestlers at the 2012 Summer Olympics
Wrestlers at the 2016 Summer Olympics
Sport wrestlers from Budapest
World Wrestling Championships medalists
21st-century Hungarian people